We Are Reasonable People is a compilation album released by Warp Records on 29 June 1998. The title of the album is a backronym of WARP. It peaked at number 14 on the UK R&B Albums Chart.

Critical reception
Music Week gave the album a positive review, stating that the album "will certainly appeal to existing fans and act as a good introduction to anyone interested in the sound of the underground."

Brainwashed listed We Are Reasonable People as the 3rd best compilation album of 1998. In 2013, Fact placed "Freeman Hardy & Willis Acid" at number 10 on their list of the 50 best Aphex Twin tracks.

Track listing

Charts

References

External links
 

1998 compilation albums
Warp (record label) compilation albums
Record label compilation albums
Intelligent dance music compilation albums
Electronic compilation albums